IMSA is the International Motor Sports Association, an auto racing governing body headquartered in Daytona Beach, Florida, United States.

IMSA may also refer to:

International Motor Sports Association 

 IMSA SportsCar Championship, International Motor Sports Association's flagship racing series from 2014 to present.
 IMSA GT Championship, International Motor Sports Association's flagship racing series from 1971 to 1998.
 IMSA GT3 Cup Challenge
 IMSA Prototype Challenge

Other motorsport

 IMSA Performance, a French sports car racing team competing in European Le Mans series

Other 

 Illinois Mathematics and Science Academy, a residential school located in Aurora, Illinois
 International Mind Sports Association, an association formed by the international federations of several intellectual games
 International Municipal Signal Association, an association covering standards, certification, and training in areas of fire alarms, highway signs and markings, traffic signals, and roadway lighting